Devaswom (
) are socio-religious trusts in India, whose members are nominated by the government and community. They oversee Hindu temples and their assets to ensure their smooth operation in accordance with traditional rituals and customs. The devaswom system notably exists in the state of Kerala, where most temples are either managed by Government of Kerala-controlled devaswoms or private bodies or families. The properties of each temple are deemed to be the personal property of the presiding deity of the temple, and are managed through a body of trustees who bear allegiance to that deity.

The five Kerala devaswoms—Guruvayur, Travancore, Malabar, Cochin, and Koodalmanikyam—manage nearly 3,000 temples together.

Revenues 
The five devaswoms earn about 1,000 crore rupees annually.

Travancore Devaswom Board 
The Travancore Devaswom Board is an autonomous body formed by the Travancore Cochin Hindu Religious Institutions Act of 1950. Sabarimala is the main income source of the Board, with 255 crore rupees accruing to it from the temple during the previous pilgrimage season. The income from the rest of the temples in Kerala was 57 crore rupees.

Malabar Devaswom Board 
The Malabar Devaswom Board was formed by the H.R & C.E (Amendment) Ordinance of 2008 of the Government of Kerala. The board has nine members. There are five divisions: Kasaragod Division, Thalassery Division, Kozhikode Division, Malappuram Division, and Palakkad Division. Temples are in Special Temple category and the others in A, B, C, D categories.

Guruvayur Devaswom Board 
The Guruvayur Devaswom Board was formed to administer the activities of Guruvayur Temple.

Cochin Devaswom Board 
The Cochin Devaswom Board was formed under the act of XV of Travancore–Cochin Hindu Religious institutions Act, 1950 to make provisions for the administration, supervision, and control of incorporated and unincorporated Devaswoms and of other Hindu Religious Endowments and funds under the Ruling area of the former Cochin State. Each temples on CDB has controlled by devaswoms.

Koodalmanikyam Devaswom Board
The Koodalmanikyam Devaswom Board is situated in Irinjalakuda, Thrissur district. It manages the Koodalmanikyam Temple.

Working
Prior to 2015, the appointments to the various posts in the devawoms were governed by the provisions in the Madras Hindu Religious Act and Charitable Endowment Act 1951, Koodalmanikyam Devaswom Act 2005, Travancore-Cochin Hindu Religious Institutions Act 1950, and Guruvayoor Devaswom Act 1978.

In 2015, based on the recommendations by the Justice Paripoornan Commission, the Congress-led UDF government set up an autonomous body for recruitment in the Dewaswom Boards.

Reservation
About half of the Devaswom board recruitments are based on reservation.
 Ezhava (17%)
 Hindu OBC excluding Ezhava (6%)
 SC/ST (12%)
 Economically backward High caste Hindus (10%)

Attempt to abolish Devaswom
In 2018, the Supreme Court of India agreed to examine the petition started by Subramanian Swamy and T. G. Mohandas to abolish devaswoms. U. U. Lalit and K. M. Joseph issued notice to the Government of Kerala and Devaswom Board of Travanacore and Cochin, and sought their response in six weeks. In 2019, the Government of Kerala opposed Swamy's plea.

References

External links 
The official website of Travancore Devaswom Board
The official website of Cochin Devaswom Board
The official website of Guruvayur Devaswom Board
Devaswom Board members to work together, The Hindu news
Government of Kerala, Travancore Devaswom Board

Hindu organisations based in India
Hindu temples in Kerala
Organisations based in Kerala